This is a list of women artists who were born in Latvia or whose artworks are closely associated with that country.

A
Aina Apse (1926–2015), potter
Lidija Auza (1914–1989), painter and decorator

B
Aleksandra Belcova (1892–1981), painter
Biruta Baumane (1922–2017), painter

C
Inta Celmiņa (born 1946), painter

D
Daina Dagnija (1937–2019), painter and textile artist
Lea Davidova-Medene (1921–1986), sculptor
Biruta Delle (born 1944), painter
Lilija Dinere (born 1955), painter, illustrator
Inta Dobrāja (1940–2020), painter
Maija Dragūne (born 1945), graphic artist
Līze Dzeguze (1908–1992), sculptor

E
Līvija Endzelīna (1927–2008), painter

G
Emīlija Gruzīte (1873–1945), painter

K
Ingrīda Kadaka (born 1967), book designer, illustrator
Aina Karlsone (1935–2012), artist, writer
Frančeska Kirke (born 1953), painter

N
Katrīna Neiburga (born 1978), video artist

O
Simona Orinska (born 1978), contemporary artist

P
Felicita Pauļuka (1925-2014), painter
Tatyana Palchuk (born 1954), painter
Lucia Peka (1912–1991), Latvian-American painter
Līga Purmale (born 1948), painter

S
Džemma Skulme (1925–2019), painter
Marta Skulme (1890–1962), sculptor
Roze Stiebra (born 1942), animator

U
Ēvī Upeniece (born 1925), sculptor

-
Latvian
Artists
Artists, women